Eye Green railway station was a station in Eye, Cambridgeshire, on the Midland and Great Northern Joint Railway line between Peterborough and Wisbech. The station was opened by the Peterborough, Wisbech and Sutton Bridge Railway (PW&SBR) on 1 August 1866 and was originally named "Eye"; it was renamed "Eye Green" on 1 October 1875. The PW&SBR became part of the Midland and Great Northern Joint Railway. It later came under the control of British Railways and was closed on 2 December 1957. The station's name as given in some timetables "Eye Green for Crowland" was misleading, since a passenger would have a three-mile walk to Crowland.

The station was adjacent to the Northam works of the London Brick Company. There was a busy siding where bricks were hand loaded onto trucks - before the days of palletisation.

There were through trains to Hunstanton, via King's Lynn.

References

External links
 Eye Green station on navigable 1946 O. S. map

Disused railway stations in Cambridgeshire
Former Midland and Great Northern Joint Railway stations
Railway stations in Great Britain opened in 1866
Railway stations in Great Britain closed in 1957
Transport in Peterborough
Buildings and structures in Peterborough
1866 establishments in England